The Cloquet fire was an immense forest fire in northern Minnesota, United States in October 1918, caused by sparks on the local railroads and dry conditions. The fire left much of western Carlton County devastated, mostly affecting Moose Lake, Cloquet, and Kettle River. Cloquet was hit the hardest by the fires. It was the worst natural disaster in Minnesota history in terms of the number of casualties in a single day. In total, 453 people died and 52,000 people were injured or displaced, 38 communities were destroyed, 250,000 acres (100,000 ha) were burned, and $73 million ($ billion in  United States dollars) in property damage was suffered. Thirteen million dollars in federal aid were disbursed.

Region overview
Carlton County was known for its logging industry during the early 20th century. Similar to other forest fires, the disaster took place over dry, harvested land which was vulnerable to potential fire destruction. The main workforce employing the majority of the area was the logging industry. The railroad, which came to the area in 1870, was a great boost for the logging industry. In 1874, a large lumber mill was built alongside the lake shore. The mill along the river gathered and floated logs down river, where they would be assembled and sawed for retail. When the logging industry was at its peak, one could walk across the lake due to the amount of logs covering the lake area.

With a new century approaching, open lands in Carlton County were overrun by farmers purchasing land from the mill. The mill's incentives for sales to farmers were the government grants on the land. With more farmers coming over, the population and activity in Carlton County grew substantially. Stores, lawyers and livestock businesses were established and the economy flourished.

The fire
On October 10, 1918, two men working near a railroad siding northwest of Cloquet saw a passenger train pass by the siding, and soon thereafter discovered a fire burning through grass and piles of wood. The fire could not be contained, and by October 12, fires had spread through northern Minnesota.

When asked about the scene at Cloquet after the fact, Albert Michaud, a special Police Officer in Cloquet was quoted by The New York Times: 

Early reports of the fire circulated rumors that the fires were intentionally started by "enemy agents", but Cloquet fire Chief F. J. Longren later confirmed that such rumors were false. One cause of the fire is believed to be from sparks from the railroad tracks that lit the dry timber, but the rapid progression of the fire through northern Minnesota was caused by factors such as drought conditions, high winds, and a lack of firefighting equipment.

Damage and fatalities
Many instances of mass deaths were reported. For example, in Moose Lake, an Associated Press Correspondent reported seeing seventy-five bodies piled in a burned building. On a road leading out of Moose Lake, "100 bodies were strewn here and there", according to The New York Times. A relief worker reported that there were thirty bodies piled in a heap in a cellar between Moose Lake and Kettle River.

Among other structures, the Duluth Country Club and the Children's Home were both a complete loss. Within Carlton and southern Saint Louis counties the towns of Brookston, Arnold, and Moose Lake were completely destroyed. Cloquet and its surrounding cities were known for the great deforestation caused by the fire.

Relief operations
The fires left thousands of people homeless. Approximately 4,700 residents of Cloquet sought refuge in Duluth, Minnesota, and Superior, Wisconsin. In total, close to 12,000 people were left homeless from neighboring towns. The victims of the inferno were sheltered temporarily in such buildings as hospitals, schools, churches, armories, and private homes. Doctors were brought in from surrounding areas to help the thousands of injured people.

Several organizations and volunteers risked their lives to help save people and property. The Minnesota Infantry National Guard was called in to help in the relief process. At about 3:00 p.m. on October 12, Lieutenant Karl A. Franklin and Captain Henry Tourtelotte of the Fourth Regiment of the National Guard were contacted to aid the Rice Lake Road area. After speaking with the Mayor of Cloquet and the Chief of Police Robert McKercher, Tourtelotte headed for Duluth with nine other people to assemble his troops and offer immediate assistance. A couple of companies were assigned to extinguishing the fire, which they were unable to do, despite their best efforts. After torrents of flame battered them down, they instead began to focus on the survivors.

Commanding Officer Roger M. Weaver of the 3rd Battalion realized the worsening severity of the situation. By 5:40 p.m., the fire chief had called on Weaver and his men who prepared for action. Scores of men were assembled in less than an hour and were then distributed to several hazard sites to aid in extinguishing the fire.

These efforts of the firefighters resulted in several important structures being saved. Among these structures were the St. James Catholic Orphanage and the Nopeming Sanatorium. The sanatorium, valued at $350,000 at the time, held close to 200 tuberculosis patients. A party of automobiles broke through walls of flames to save these victims. The Minnesota Home Guard assumed management of the aftermath.

Recovery

The recovery of the region was area-specific due to the nature of the damage inflicted. The damage that Duluth sustained had very little threat of impacting the economy, although the fire did destroy several small suburbs, as well as farming communities, but most of Duluth's economy at the time centered on the transportation and mining sectors, which were left relatively untouched.

The farming industry suffered a great loss. A large amount of livestock was killed and many acres of farmland were torched. Charles Mahnke, who was the Moose Lake member of the relief commission, told the farmers, "We are going to put you back as well off as you were before." Relief assistance aided the farming community, and with their help the farmers were given a place to stay and the means for regaining what they had lost. The Northwestern Telephone Company restored phone service by Sunday at approximately 7:00 pm. The education of Moose Lake resumed on January 6, 1919, with the benevolent assistance provided by the Red Cross.

Cloquet had suffered significantly more damage than Duluth and the recovery was much slower and much larger in scale. On Sunday, October 20, Cloquet citizens met in Carlton County to talk about what needed to be done. The secondary industries included the Northwest Paper Company, the Cloquet Tie and Post Company, the Berst-Forster-Dixfield Company toothpick factory, and the Rathborne, Hair and Ridgeway Company box factory. These secondary industries would eventually ascend to the primary industries, but the recovery of the primary industries was much more complex. The Northern Lumber Company, which was responsible for a significant percentage of Cloquet's economy, had been destroyed. The Northwest Paper Company began production a week after the fire, which provided much needed jobs for the citizens of Cloquet. The Red Cross stepped in and constructed many temporary shelters for the victims' families of Cloquet. By November 15 there were over 200 shelters built with the help of the Red Cross and other dedicated townspeople. Within a five-year span Cloquet had industrialized and rebuilt many of the lost railroads, and the citizens had moved out of their temporary Red Cross shelters into new houses.

Memorials

Many memorials have been set up to commemorate the 1918 fire. A twenty-seven-foot monument near Duluth memorializes the 453 lives lost. The Moose Lake Area Historical Society annually honors the lives lost at the Soo Line Depot, which in 1995 was opened as a railroad and fire museum. The Soo Line Depot is both a fire and railroad museum that shows the history of the railroads as well as tells the story of the fire.

See also
 Peshtigo Fire of 1871
 Great Hinckley Fire of 1894
 Baudette fire of 1910
 Camp Fire of 2018

Notes

References 
 Carroll, Francis M, and Franklin R. Raiter. The Fires of Autumn: The Cloquet-Moose Lake Disaster of 1918. St. Paul. Minnesota Historical Society Press. 1990. 
 "Fires Rages in Minnesota." The History Channel Website. 2008. 5 February 2008. http://www.history.com/search/.
 Johnson, Lois E. "Commemorating the 80th Anniversary of the Fires of 1918." The Minnesota History Interpreter. June 1998-6.
 "Moose Lake Minnesota." The 1918 Fire. 1998. 5 February 2008.
 Panger, Mike. "The USGen Web Project." Welcome to Carlton County, Minnesota General Info. 15 June 1999. Cloquet. 5 February 2008. https://web.archive.org/web/20080209015326/http://www.mjpdan.com/genweb/carlton/general.htm.
 "500 Lives Lost in Forest Fires." The New York Times. 14 October 1918.
 "At least 1000 persons perish..." (LOC image: The Tomahawk newspaper of White Earth, MN, Oct. 24, 1918. 
 Cloquet, Duluth, and Moose Lake Fires, 1918. Paul Nelson, mnopedia.org. (See bibliography)

1918 fires in the United States
1918 in Minnesota
Aitkin County, Minnesota
Carlton County, Minnesota
Pine County, Minnesota
St. Louis County, Minnesota
Wildfires in Minnesota
United States home front during World War I